Ida Engberg (born 1 July 1984) is a Swedish techno DJ and record producer.

Ida began her career when she was 18. After filling in for another DJ, she got a regular night at a club. Later she went to work at the Spy Bar, one of the most famous clubs in Stockholm. This was her big break. From that time she has worked with Roger Sanchez, John Dahlbäck, Sebastian Ingrosso and Eric Prydz. She was also a DJ at the Cocktail Club, again in Stockholm.

The first single she released is Disco Volante along with the Icelandic singer Björk. The song was a hit in the Netherlands, Belgium and Germany in the summer of 2007. In 2008, Sébastien Léger remixed the song. This single was released in the spring of 2008. She has played at various large electronic music festivals.

Engberg is married to fellow Swedish DJ Adam Beyer. In 2011, their first child was born, and in 2014 their third child was born.
Engberg is vegan.

References 

Swedish DJs
Living people
1984 births
Electronic dance music DJs
Swedish women in electronic music